Sardsir Posht Gary (also Romanized as Sardsīr Posht Gāry) is a village in Ozgoleh Rural District, Ozgoleh District, Salas-e Babajani County, Kermanshah Province, Iran. At the 2006 census, its population was 106, in 22 families.

References 

Populated places in Salas-e Babajani County